Muhammad Syazwan bin Yusoff (born 17 April 1992) is a Malaysian footballer who plays as a goalkeeper.

Club career

Kelantan FA
Born in Morak, Tumpat, Syazwan started his career with Kelantan President's Cup team in 2010. He was the first choice of his team in every match besides Judtanna Eh Put another goalkeeper. He was registered for Kelantan senior squad as the third goalkeeper by Kelantan's coach, M. Karathu during 2011 season. In season 2012, he was selected as the second goalkeeper behind Khairul Fahmi Che Mat after Mohd Shahrizan Ismail having 6-month suspended from Malaysian football.

Melaka United
In December 2015, Syazwan joined Malaysia Premier League club Melaka United on loan from Kelantan FA until the end of the season. Syazwan made his debut for the club in the League Cup against Sime Darby F.C. playing at the Selayang Stadium. That match end up draw 2–2. Syazwan became regular member of Melaka United's first team during the 2016 season.

Career statistics

Honours

Kelantan President's Cup Team
 Malaysia President Cup: 2010

Kelantan FA
 Malaysia Super League: 2012, 2011
 Malaysia Cup: 2012
 Malaysia FA Cup: 2012, 2013 ;Runner-up 2011, 2015
 Malaysia Charity Shield: 2011 ;Runner-up 2012, 2013

Melaka United
 Malaysia Premier League: 2016

International career
In 2012, Syazwan has been called up by Ong Kim Swee for Malaysia U-23 training. The training lasted for 12 days and doing some friendly matches around Australia.

References

External links
 

Living people
1992 births
Malaysian footballers
Kelantan FA players
People from Kelantan
Malaysia Super League players
Association football goalkeepers
Melaka United F.C. players